The River Gaur is a river in Perthshire which enters Loch Rannoch.

References

Rivers of Perth and Kinross